The Vinland Sagas are two Icelandic texts written independently of each other in the early 13th century—The Saga of the Greenlanders (Grænlendinga Saga) and The Saga of Erik the Red (Eiríks Saga Rauða).  The sagas were written down between 1220 and 1280 and describe events occurring around 970–1030.

The Saga of Erik the Red and The Saga of the Greenlanders both contain different accounts of Norse voyages to Vinland. The name Vinland, meaning "Wineland," is attributed to the discovery of grapevines upon the arrival of Leif Eiriksson in North America. The Vinland Sagas represent the most complete information available regarding the Norse exploration of the Americas, although due to Iceland's oral tradition, they cannot be deemed completely historically accurate and include contradictory details. However, historians commonly believe these sources contain substantial evidence of Viking exploration of North America through the descriptions of topography, natural resources, and native culture. In comparing the events of both books, a realistic timeline can be created.

The veracity of the Sagas was supported by the discovery and excavation of a Viking Era settlement at L'Anse aux Meadows in Newfoundland, Canada. Research done in the early 1960s by Norwegian explorer Helge Ingstad and his wife, archaeologist Anne Stine Ingstad, identified an old Norse settlement located at what is now the L'Anse aux Meadows National Historic Site of Canada.

Translations
English translations of both of the Vinland sagas can be found in the following works:

Kunz, Keneva; Sigurdsson, Gisli, The Vinland Sagas, London: Penguin, 2008, .
Kunz, Keneva, The Sagas of the Icelanders, London: Penguin, 2005, .
Magnusson, Magnus; Palsson, Hermann, The Vinland Sagas, London: Penguin, 1973, .
Reeves, Arthur Middleton, The Finding of Wineland the Good: The History of the Icelandic Discovery of America, London: Henry Frowde, Oxford University Press, 1890

See also
 Vikings
 Vinland
 Vinland Saga

Notes

References
Brown, Nancy Marie (2012) Song of the Vikings: Snorri and the Making of Norse Myths (Palgrave Macmillan) 
Haugen, Einar (2007) Voyages To Vinland – The First American Saga Newly Translated And Interpreted (Barzun Press)  
Hreinsson, Vidar   (1997)  The Complete Sagas of Icelanders  (Leifur Eiriksson Publishing, Reykjavik, Iceland)

Further reading
Grove, Jonathan. (2009) "The place of Greenland in medieval Icelandic saga narrative", in Norse Greenland: Selected Papers of the Hvalsey Conference 2008, Journal of the North Atlantic Special Volume 2, 30–51
Jones, Gwyn   (2001) A History of the Vikings (Oxford University Press) 
Ingstad, Helge; Ingstad, Anne Stine (2001)  The Viking Discovery of America: The Excavation of a Norse Settlement in L'Anse Aux Meadows, Newfoundland (Checkmark Books. New York) 
Magnusson, Magnus (1976)Viking, Hammer of the North (Putnam) Magnus Magnusson 
Magnusson, Magnus (1979) Viking expansion westwards (Bodley Head archaeology  Book Club Associates) 
Solar storm confirms Vikings settled in North America exactly 1,000 years ago, The Guardian, October 21, 2021

External links
Vinland Sagas, National Museum of Natural History (archived website)
Location of Vinland, Emuseum - Minnesota State University, Mankato (archived website)
Smithsonian Arctic Studies Center (archived website)

Cultural depictions of Leif Erikson
Sagas of Icelanders
Vinland